The 2002 Arizona Cardinals season was the franchise’s 83rd year with the National Football League and 15th season in Arizona. It was Jake Plummer’s final season with the Cardinals as he went to the Denver Broncos in the 2003 off-season.

This was the Cardinals' first season in the NFC West. The realignment put the team in the same division as the Rams, which at the time played in the Cardinals' former home of St. Louis. The Cardinals thus played one game in their former city every year from this season until , after which the Rams returned to the Los Angeles metropolitan area.

Offseason

NFL Draft

Undrafted free agents

Pat Tillman
In May 2002, eight months after the September 11, 2001, attacks and after completing the fifteen remaining games of the 2001 season which followed the attacks (at a salary of $512,000 per year), Pat Tillman turned down a contract offer of $3.6 million over three years from the Cardinals to enlist in the U.S. Army.

Personnel

Staff

Roster

Regular season

Schedule
In the 2002 regular season, the Cardinals’ non-divisional, conference opponents were primarily from the NFC East, although they also played the Carolina Panthers from the NFC South, and the Detroit Lions from the NFC North. Their non-conference opponents were from the AFC West, the second consecutive season the Cardinals faced the AFC West. 

Note: Intra-division opponents are in bold text.

Game Summaries

Week 2: at Seattle Seahawks

Week 10: vs. Seattle Seahawks

Week 14: vs. Detroit Lions

Standings

Awards and records

Milestones

References

Cardinals on Pro Football Reference
Cardinals on jt-sw.com

Arizona Cardinals
Arizona Cardinals seasons
Arizona